Mark Lloyd Flythe (born October 4, 1968) is a former American football defensive end who played for the New York Giants of the National Football League (NFL). He played college football at Penn State University.

References 

Living people
1968 births
Players of American football from Pennsylvania
American football defensive ends
Penn State Nittany Lions football players
New York Giants players
West Windsor-Plainsboro High School South alumni